Valburg is a village in the Dutch province of Gelderland. It is located in the municipality of Overbetuwe, about 10 km northwest of Nijmegen.

Valburg was a separate municipality until 2001, when it became part of Overbetuwe.

History 
It was first mentioned in 792 or 793 as "in uilla Falburcmarca", and means "the castle of Falho (person)". The eastern side of the village developed into an esdorp. The Dutch Reformed Church dates from the 14th century with a 13th century tower. It has been restored between 1968 and 1971. The grist mill Nieuw Leven was built in 1750 and restored in 1996. In 1840, it was home to 688 people.

Gallery

References

Municipalities of the Netherlands disestablished in 2001
Populated places in Gelderland
Former municipalities of Gelderland
Overbetuwe